Bordesley may refer to several places in England:

Bordesley, Birmingham, an area in the UK West Midlands
Bordesley railway station a railway station in Birmingham
Bordesley Junction a canal junction in Birmingham
Birmingham Bordesley (UK Parliament constituency) a former United Kingdom Parliamentary constituency in Birmingham
Bordesley Green, a separate area of Birmingham
Bordesley, Worcestershire, an area of Redditch
Bordesley Abbey, a ruined abbey near Reddich

See also
 Farm, Bordesley, within the former manor of Bordesley, now part of Sparkbrook, Birmingham